Arvid Filip Trybom (December 24, 1850, Fivelstad Östergötland County – February 15 1913, Stockholm) was a Swedish zoologist and entomologist. He participated in major zoological research trips and in 1876 he was an entomologist in Adolf Erik Nordenskiöld's expedition to the Yenisei River.In 1877 he investigated the fauna of the Kola Peninsula and Murman. He specialised in Odonata and Thysanoptera.Later he became a fish biologist and fisheries inspector.

References
Osborn, H. 1952 A Brief History of Entomology Including Time of Demosthenes and Aristotle to Modern Times with over Five Hundred Portraits. Columbus, Ohio, The Spahr & Glenn Company, 1-303 S., B15: 6024a, pp. 230

Swedish entomologists
Swedish zoologists
Swedish lepidopterists
1913 deaths
1850 births